The following is information on Tokushima Vortis during the 2010 football season.

Competitions

Player statistics

Other pages
 J. League official site

Tokushima Vortis
Tokushima Vortis seasons